Achillea erba-rotta, common name simple leaved milfoil, is a perennial flowering plant of the genus Achillea, belonging to the sunflower family.

Description
Achillea erba-rotta is a polymorphic species, as its physical characteristics clearly vary depending on the variety. The biological form is chamaephyte suffruticose, as these plants have perennating buds borne close to the ground and are woody in the lower part of the stem, with herbaceous yearly branches. The primary root is a rhizome.

This plant reaches on average  in height. The stems are woody and creeping, almost glabrous or with short hair and with erect flowering branches. Leaves of sterile branches are lanceolate-spatulate, 5–7 mm wide and 26–30 mm long, with 4-7 teeth on each side.  Cauline leaves are alternate, sessile, toothed and progressively linear, about 2–3 mm wide and 11–22 mm long. Flowers are hermaphroditic and pentamerous, arranged in corymbs with many heads, about 3 mm in diameter, with rounded ligules. The flowering period extends from July through August. The fruit is a flattened achene without pappus.

Distribution
This typical plant of Alps is present in Italy, France, Switzerland and Austria.

Habitat

Subspecies
accepted by The Plant List
Achillea erba-rotta subsp. erba-rotta
Achillea erba-rotta subsp. moschata (Wulfen) Vacc.
Achillea erba-rotta subsp. rupestris (Porta) I.Richardson

Hybrids
 Achillea × obscura Nees

References

 Tutin, T.G. et al. – Flora Europaea, second edition – 1993

External links
 Biolib
 Acta Plantarum

erba-rotta
Plants described in 1773
Flora of Europe
Taxa named by Carlo Allioni